James Stansfield Collier  (1870 – 9 February 1935) was an English physician and neurologist. His brother was the surgeon Horace Stansfield Collier.

Early life
Collier was born in 1870, the second son of Alfred Henry Collier and his wife Sarah Collier (née Stansfield). Sarah was a descendant of the Stansfield family of Stansfield, Yorkshire. His elder brother was the surgeon Horace Stansfield Collier (1864–1930).

Career 
After education at the City and Guilds of London Institute, James Collier studied medicine at St Mary's Hospital Medical School, graduating BSc (Lond.) in 1890, MB in 1894, and MD in 1896 from the University of London. He held junior appointments at St Mary's Hospital and was a demonstrator of biology there. At London's National Hospital, Queen Square he was appointed house physician in 1898, registrar in 1899, pathologist in 1901, assistant physician in 1902, physician to out-patients in 1908, and physician in 1921. He also held appointments at St George's Hospital and lectured there on medicine and neurology. He lectured on neurology at Bethlem Royal Hospital and was consulting physician to the Royal Eye Hospital, Southwark.

On 1 September 1906 at All Souls Church, Langham Place, Collier married Minna Maude Summerhayes. They had one son and two daughters. James Collier's elder brother was Horace Stansfield Collier, F.R.C.S.

Honours
1903 — Fellow of the Royal College of Physicians
1923 — President of the Section of Neurology, Annual Meeting of the Royal Society of Medicine
1928 — Lumleian Lecturer
1930 — Savill Memorial Orator
1931–1932 — FitzPatrick Lecturer (lectures in 1931 and 1932 on the development of neurology from 1800 to 1930)
1932 — Morison Lecturer
1934 — Harveian Orator

Selected publications

References

1870 births
1935 deaths
19th-century English medical doctors
20th-century English medical doctors
British neurologists
Alumni of St Mary's Hospital Medical School
Physicians of St George's Hospital
Royal Army Medical Corps officers
Fellows of the Royal College of Physicians